Mummigatti is a village in Dharwad district of Karnataka, India.

Demographics 
As of the 2011 Census of India there were 943 households in Mummigatti and a total population of 4,731 consisting of 2,371 males and 2,360 females. There were 682 children ages 0-6.

References

Villages in Dharwad district